Meru Peak is a mountain located in the Garhwal Himalayas, in the state of Uttarakhand in India. The  peak lies between Thalay Sagar and Shivling, and has some highly challenging routes. The name Meru likely originated from the Sanskrit word for "peak".

The mountain has three distinct peaks: southern, central, and northern. The two higher peaks were climbed earlier than the harder central peak, which was first climbed in a 2001 solo ascent by Valery Babanov, twice by other teams in 2006, and for the first time along the "Shark's Fin" route in 2011.

Shark's Fin route 
This 1400m route to Meru Central follows North East Pillar, over the "Shark's Fin", a massive granite feature on the northeast face variously described as a "prow", "blade" or "nose". Its exceptional difficulty is exacerbated by the fact that its most technical rock climbing is near the top, meaning that heavy gear needs to be carried almost all the way. It had been described as "one of the most attempted and most coveted lines in the entire Himalaya" and "one of the last remaining challenges of big wall mountaineering."

The route begins after a two-day approach, a 700m snow slope and a rock ramp. Next, is a steep, overhanging wall nicknamed the "Indian Ocean Wall" climbed with aid techniques up to A4 difficulty. This is followed by the "Crystal Pitch", an overhanging and exposed section of aid climbing. The last section combines mixed and aid climbing.

Attempts 
American Mugs Stump attempted the route in 1986, thwarted by an avalanche on the lower slopes. In 1988 he tried and failed again, defeated by a lengthy snow storm.

A serious attempt was made by the primarily British team of Paul Pritchard, Johnny Dawes, Noel Craine, Dave Kendall and Philip Lloyd in 1993. This failure included Dawes losing a boot, and later having a major fall.

Further unsuccessful attempts followed in the 1990s included Scott Backes. In 1997, Nick Bullock, Jules Cartwright and Jamie Fisher achieved a height of 6,100m.

Pete Takeda and Dave Sheldon made three attempts, in 1998, 1999 and 2001, all unsuccessful.

In 2001, Russian Valery Babanov climbed the bottom part of the route to 5,800m before descending. He summited via a different route, which became known as "Shangri-La", later the same year. This was the first time Meru Central had been summited, by any route.

In 2003, Americans Conrad Anker, Doug Chabot and Bruce Miller completed the bottom part of the wall, before veering off onto ice flutings, then eventually turning back.

In 2004, a Japanese expedition failed after an accident injured one of the team members. The same team attempted again in 2006, but departed the Shark's Fin to reach the summit.

In October 2006, Czech climbers Marek Holecek and Jan Kreisinger attempted the route, but departed the ridge halfway up to successfully pursue an easier route to the summit.

In 2008, the team of Conrad Anker, Jimmy Chin, and Renan Ozturk climbed to within two pitches (150m) of the summit before turning back. They had experienced severe storms, forcing them to spend four days in the portaledge, depleting their food supplies.

In 2009, Slovenians Silvo Karo, Marko Lukic and Andrej Grmovsek unsuccessfully attempted the route, turning around at the base of the headwall, due to insufficient gear, poor acclimatisation and an Alpine-style approach.

The first successful climb of the route was made in October 2011 by Conrad Anker, Jimmy Chin, and Renan Ozturk, the same team that had narrowly failed in 2008. The attempt was made only 5 months after Ozturk suffered serious spinal and skull injuries while skiing. They overcame a broken portaledge, and a "mini-stroke" suffered by Ozturk, but cited excellent weather as a major factor in their success, which was recognized also by Guinness World Records as the first ascent of this peak. They reached the summit on their eighth day, then it took them three days to descend.

In 2015, the feature film Meru was released, documenting Anker's team's two attempts on the route. It included footage taken by Chin and Ozturk on both attempts, originally intended just for posterity.

See also
 Meru, a 2015 documentary film about climbing the Shark's Fin route

References

Mountains of Uttarakhand
Geography of Uttarkashi district
Six-thousanders of the Himalayas